The 1934 Rose Bowl, played on January 1, 1934, was an American football bowl game. It was the 20th Rose Bowl Game. The Columbia Lions defeated the Stanford Indians (now Cardinal) 7-0. Cliff Montgomery, the Columbia quarterback, was named the Rose Bowl Player Of The Game when the award was created in 1953 and selections were made retroactively. At 35,000, it has the lowest attendance in the Rose Bowl game since the Rose Bowl Stadium was built in 1922. This was one of the few rainy New Year's Day celebrations in Pasadena, California. Rain three days before had turned the Rose Bowl stadium into a small lake.

Teams

For New Year's Day, 1934, the Lions traveled to Pasadena, California to play the heavily favored Stanford Indians.  Stanford had only been scored on four times the entire season, but the Light Blue had performed well, going 7–1 for the season.

Columbia University Lions
Columbia had lost only one game, to Princeton.

Stanford University Indians
In the previous 1932 season, the "Thundering Herd" of the USC Trojans, led by Howard Jones, defeated Stanford 13–0 on the way to a second consecutive national championship and victory in the 1933 Rose Bowl. Stanford player Frank Alustiza proclaimed “They Will never do that to our team. We will never lose to the Trojans.” A few minutes later, another member of the team proclaimed, “Let’s make that a vow.” The press reported on the vow, but it was forgotten until the next fall when facing USC, they were suddenly called upon to make good upon it.
On November 11, in Los Angeles, USC (6–0–1) hosted Stanford (5–1–1). The Trojans suffered their first defeat in 27 games, losing 13–7, in a game that ultimately decided the Pacific Coast Conference championship. Thus, the Stanford class of 1936 became the "Vow Boys".

Game summary

For the three days before the game, torrential rains soaked the field. “When we arrived the day before the game [after traveling from New York by train], the Rose Bowl looked like a lake,” Montgomery, the team captain, recalled in a 1981 article in The New York Times. The Pasadena fire department pumped out the stadium.  Game day itself, though, was also uncharacteristically rainy for Southern California, and the muddy field rendered the game scoreless going into the second quarter. At that time, and with the ball on the Stanford 17-yard line, Columbia quarterback Cliff Montgomery '34 executed a trick play called KF-79.  During the play, he spun and slipped the ball to Al Barabas '36, then faked a hand-off to Ed Brominski '35, who ran in the opposite direction.  While the Indians went for Montgomery and Brominski, Barabas successfully ran around the defense to score for the Lions. Stanford "Vow Boys" Bobby Grayson (152 yards on 28 carries), end Monk Moscript, lineman Bob Reynolds and other stars could not overcome the margin as mishaps ruined Stanford's chances. Columbia ended up winning the game, 7–0, capping one of the biggest upsets in Rose Bowl history.  The win also cemented Lou Little's reputation at Columbia as the Lions' greatest coach thus far.

Aftermath
Winning the 1934 Rose Bowl has, to date, been the greatest accomplishment in Columbia football history. The Columbia Lions would have a notable losing streak from 1983 through 1988. Columbia lost 44 games in a row during these years, the second-longest in major college football history. Cliff Montgomery died on April 21, 2005.

The "Vow Boys", the Stanford class of 1936, never did lose to USC, defeating them again 16–0 in 1934, and 3–0 in 1935. The 1933 Michigan Wolverines team, who tied for first in the Big Ten conference with Minnesota on a 0–0 tie between the two teams, was voted the 1933 national champion. USC, who had won the previous two years, and who finished the season 10–1–1 was denied a third consecutive national championship.

References

Further reading
 

Rose Bowl
Rose Bowl Game
Columbia Lions football bowl games
Stanford Cardinal football bowl games
Rose Bowl
Roe Bowl
Columbia University